Bulbophyllum ellipticifolium is a species of orchid in the genus Bulbophyllum. The orchid is found on the island of New Guinea.

References 

The Bulbophyllum-Checklist
The Internet Orchid Species Photo Encyclopedia
The Internet Orchid Species Photo Encyclopedia

ellipticifolium